The modern pentathlon at the 2024 Summer Olympics in Paris is scheduled to take place from 8–11 August 2024 at the Palace of Versailles and the Vélodrome National. The Palace of Versailles will host all the modern pentathlon events, excluding the fencing ranking rounds which will occur at the National Velodrome. Two events will be contested, one for men and another for women.

In late 2021, the International Olympic Committee announced that modern pentathlon would be dropped from the Olympic program after 2024, following the controversy in the riding segment of the women's event in Tokyo 2020, which saw German coach Kim Raisner ejected from the Games for physically assaulting one of the horses. 

In response to this incident, the Union Internationale de Pentathlon Moderne (UIPM) was warned by the IOC to replace the riding segment with a new fifth discipline to reconsider the sport's inclusion in future editions.

Format
Modern pentathlon contains five events; pistol shooting, épée fencing,  freestyle swimming, show jumping, and a  cross-country run.

The first three events (fencing, swimming, and show jumping) were scored on a points system. Those points were then converted into a time handicap for the final combined event (pistol shooting and cross-country running), with the points leader starting first and each other competitor having a delayed start based on how many points behind the leader they were. This results in the finish order of the run being the final ranking for the event.

Similar to the previous Games, the fencing will consist of two rounds: the traditional round-robin stage plus a "bonus round." In the round-robin, each competitor faced every other competitor in a one-touch bout. The competitors will be ranked according to how many victories they earn. The bonus round will be held on one piste in a ladder, knock-out system. The two lowest-ranked competitors from the round-robin face each other in another one-touch bout; the winner will be credited with the additional point (round-robin victories being worth 6 points) and advanced to face the next-lowest ranked competitor. This continues, up the ranking ladder, until all competitors have competed in the bonus round.

The swimming portion will consist of a 200-metre freestyle race, with a score based on time.

The show jumping competition will involve riding an unfamiliar horse over a course with 12 obstacles. The score was based on penalties for fallen bars, refusals, falls, and being over the time limit. Following the show jumping in Tokyo concerns were raised regarding the poor horsemanship of some of the competitors and the ethics of this section of the competition; resulting in Modern Pentathlon's governing body promising a review.

The running and pistol shooting events are combined in the laser-run as they have been since 2012: athletes face four rounds of shooting, each followed by an 800-metre (874.9 yards) run. In each round of shooting, they shoot laser pistols at targets 10 meters away. Competitors must hit five targets, or have 50 seconds elapse before they can move to the next leg of the run; there is no additional penalty for missed shots. Because the athletes have staggered starts based on the first three events, the first athlete to cross the finish line is the winner.

Qualification 

Seventy-two athletes are eligible to qualify for each of the two events; a maximum of two per gender from any nation. Qualification methods remain the same for both the men's and women's events.

Host nation France reserves a single place for each in the men's and women's events, while two universality places will be allocated by UIPM once the rest of the qualifiers are decided.

The qualification period commences with the awarding of the first quota spot to the winner of the 2023 UIPM World Cup final. Five continental meets will afford twenty more places each per gender between January and December 2023: one each from Africa and Oceania, five from Asia, eight from Europe, and five from the Americas with a maximum of a single quota per NOC (two winners each from NORCECA and South America, and the gold-medal winner. irrespective of region, from the 2023 Pan American Games in Santiago, Chile). Three places will be awarded to the highest-ranked modern pentathletes in each gender-based event at the 2023 and 2024 UIPM World Championships, with the remainder of the total quota offered to those vying for qualification based on the UIPM world rankings.

Medal summary

Medal table

Medalists

See also
Modern pentathlon at the 2022 Asian Games
Modern pentathlon at the 2023 Pan American Games

References

2024 Summer Olympics events
2020
2024 in modern pentathlon